United Daily may refer to:

 United Daily News, a newspaper in Taiwan
 United Daily News (Philippines), a Chinese-language newspaper in the Philippines
 United News, formerly known as United Daily Press, the English-language edition of United Daily News (Philippines)
 United Daily, a sister newspaper of the Sarawak Tribune, in Malaysia